The Union and Liberty Party (PUL) is a political party in San Luis Province, Argentina. Independent of the Justicialist Party, it nevertheless defines itself as Peronist and supports the administration of dissident Peronist governor Alberto Rodríguez Saá with several leading PUL figures serving in the provincial government. Party leader Eduardo Gomina serves as provincial Minister of Environment.

External links
Official site

San Luis Province
Peronist parties and alliances in Argentina
Provincial political parties in Argentina